Les Moëres is a former commune in the Nord department in northern France. On 1 January 2016, it was merged into the commune Ghyvelde.

Heraldry

Population

See also
Communes of the Nord department
Les Moëres

References

Moeres
French Flanders